Leo Gudas (born May 20, 1965) is a Czech former professional ice hockey defenceman.

Playing career
Gudas began his playing career in 1981 with TJ PS Stadion Liberec in the second-tier 1st. Czech National Hockey League before joining HC Sparta Praha of the top-tier Czechoslovak First Ice Hockey League in 1983. He moved to HK Dukla Trenčín in 1986 for one season before returning to Sparta Praha.

In 1990, Gudas was drafted into the National Hockey League, selected 251st overall by the Calgary Flames in the 1990 NHL Entry Draft. Gudas though never signed with the Flames, nor did he ever play in North America. Instead, he moved to Finland and signed for JYP Jyväskylä in the SM-liiga. After two seasons, he moved to Germany's Eishockey-Bundesliga and signed for Hedos München before returning to Sparta Praha for a third spell, in the newly created Czech Extraliga, founded following the peaceful separation of Czechoslovakia.

Gudas later had spells in Switzerland's National League for EHC Biel and in Norway's GET-ligaen for the Spektrum Flyers before returning to the Czech Extraliga once more in 1995, signing for HC Kometa Brno. In 1996, Gudas moved to Sweden with IF Troja-Ljungby in the Hockeyettan before returning to Germany in 1998 for the Augsburger Panther of the Deutsche Eishockey Liga, the successor league to the Bundesliga he played in six years prior. He followed up with spell in the 2nd Bundesliga for Heilbronner EC and in the Czech 1.liga for HC Berounští Medvědi before ending his playing career in 2003.

Coaching career
Gudas worked as an assistant coach for HC Sparta Praha and Piráti Chomutov before becoming head coach for SK Kadaň. He also worked as head coach for HC Most, ŠHK 37 Piešťany and SC Csíkszereda.

Personal life
Gudas is the father of Florida Panthers defenseman Radko Gudas. He is also the father-in-law of goaltender Michal Neuvirth, following Neuvirth's marriage to Gudas' daughter, Karolina.

Career statistics

Regular season and playoffs

International

References

External links
 

1965 births
Living people
Augsburger Panther players
Calgary Flames draft picks
Czech ice hockey defencemen
Czechoslovak ice hockey defencemen
EHC Biel players
HC Berounští Medvědi players
HC Bílí Tygři Liberec players
HC Kometa Brno players
HC Sparta Praha players
Heilbronner EC players
HK Dukla Trenčín players
Ice hockey players at the 1992 Winter Olympics
JYP Jyväskylä players
Olympic bronze medalists for Czechoslovakia
Olympic medalists in ice hockey
People from Bruntál
Medalists at the 1992 Winter Olympics
Olympic ice hockey players of Czechoslovakia
IF Troja/Ljungby players
Sportspeople from the Moravian-Silesian Region
Czech expatriate ice hockey players in Sweden
Czechoslovak expatriate sportspeople in Finland
Czechoslovak expatriate ice hockey people
Expatriate ice hockey players in Finland
Czech expatriate sportspeople in Germany
Czech expatriate sportspeople in Norway
Czech expatriate ice hockey players in Switzerland
Expatriate ice hockey players in Germany
Expatriate ice hockey players in Norway